The Martin V. Linwell House is "one of the finest remaining examples of Late Victorian architecture in North Dakota."  It is a property in Northwood, North Dakota that was listed on the National Register of Historic Places in 1980. It was built in 1895 and includes Queen Anne architecture.

References

Houses on the National Register of Historic Places in North Dakota
Houses in Grand Forks County, North Dakota
Houses completed in 1895
Queen Anne architecture in North Dakota
National Register of Historic Places in Grand Forks County, North Dakota
1895 establishments in North Dakota